In Greek mythology, Paeon or Paion (Ancient Greek: Παίων, gen.: Παίονος) was a son of Poseidon by Helle, who fell into the Hellespont. In some legends he was called Edonus. He was the brother of the giant Almops.

Notes

References
 Grimal, Pierre, The Dictionary of Classical Mythology, Wiley-Blackwell, 1996, . "Helle" p. 190
Hyginus. The Myths of Hyginus, translated and edited by Mary Grant. University of Kansas Publications in Humanistic Studies, no. 34. Lawrence: University of Kansas Press, 1960.
Pseudo-Eratosthenes, "The Constellations 19", in Star Myths of the Greeks and Romans: a Sourcebook Containing the Constellations of Pseudo-Eratosthenes and the Poetic Astronomy of Hyginus, translated and edited by Theony Condos, Red Wheel/Weiser, 1997. .
Stephanus of Byzantium, Stephani Byzantii Ethnicorum quae supersunt, edited by August Meineike (1790-1870), published 1849. A few entries from this important ancient handbook of place names have been translated by Brady Kiesling. Online version at the Topos Text Project.
Smith, William, A dictionary of Greek and Roman biography and mythology. London. Online at Perseus

Family of Athamas
Mythology of Macedonia (ancient kingdom)
Mythology of Macedonia (region)